Lake Whangape (also written as Wangape, Whangapu, or Whangapae) is shallow, supertrophic, lateral and the second largest lake (after Lake Waikare) in the lower Waikato River basin in New Zealand. One source said the name translated to 'a large sheet of water', another that it was a chief's name.

From the 1860s the catchment has lost most of its forest cover and the lake has changed from clear and rich in aquatic vegetation to a murky, algal lake.

Geology 
The lake is a lateral lake, dammed by a levee of the Waikato, probably built up as a result of sea-level rise and sediment from the Taupo Volcanic Zone about 2,000 years ago.

To the west of the lake the rocks are made up of the 30m year old (Tertiary) Whaingaroa and Glen Massey Formations, the Whaingaroan rocks of the Te Kuiti Group. The Karapiro Formation (part of the Walton subgroup) outcrops towards the east of the lake.

Hot springs 
They are close to a contact between outcropping Early Jurassic “greywacke basement” and the overlying Tertiary rocks consisting of claystones, limestones and sandstones.

The springs have been named as Whangape, Awaroa, Naike, Waiora, Te Maire, or Te Puia. In the 1890s boat trips were made to the springs from Rangiriri. A 1905 earthquake enlarged the main spring. The springs are on private land and not now open to the public.

History 
The lake was on the edge of the area which Ngāti Tipa had settled. At the entrance to the lake, Ngapuhi killed 40 or 50, during the Musket Wars in 1832. In 1843, Rev Benjamin Ashwell intervened in a dispute between Ngāti Pou and Ngāti Mahuta over an eel (tuna) weir at the lake outlet. It seems it wasn't fully resolved, for, in 1866, a similar dispute was settled by giving the Ngāti Mahuta hapus, Ngāti Naho and Ngāti Tipa, equal rights over tuna at the lake.

In 1864 the Whangape area was described as inaccessible to the British troops in the Invasion of the Waikato, due to the swamps and bush.

Whangape was one of 5 ridings making up Raglan County Council when it was formed in 1876.

In the confiscated area, which included the lake, as part of a policy of opening up land for settlement under the deferred payment scheme, the Government built bridleways from the river, to give access to two  blocks. A  road to Awaroa was approved in 1878. By 1881,  had been opened as far as Glen Murray, through heavy swamp at the Churchill end. By 1883 a through track from the Waikato River to the West Coast was in existence. At the same time another was built from south of the lake, towards the Awaroa. By the middle of 1883, nearly  had been opened Work began on roads at Rangiriri in 1889, the first section being to the lake.

However, the surrounding roads remained poor, so the lake and its neighbouring streams were used for transport, a Whangape Launch Company being set up in 1906 to convey goods from Rangiriri. Earlier, in 1894, Parliament had been asked to "have obstructions in the shape of eel weirs removed from the navigable creeks flowing from Whangape Lake into the Waikato River, so as to enable steamers now running on the Waikato River to carry goods for settlers in that district." In 1889 the weir had been partly removed to allow a boat to get through.

Water levels 
Water flows into the lake from the Waikato River, when it is high.

Pollution 
Until at least 1869 the lake was clear enough to see plants growing in the deepest parts and it supported a diverse community of native submerged vegetation. In the 1890s the native forest catchment was cleared for pasture.

A 2006 Ministry for the Environment report said water quality was declining. Frequent monitoring by Waikato Regional Council from 2008 to 2013 showed a Secchi depth of 0.04 m to 0.69 m (average 0.24 m) and chlorophyll concentrations exceeding 100 mg m-3. Between 2010 and 2014, 62% of samples exceeded recreational guideline levels for blue-green algae. A health warning was also issued in 2020.

Wildlife 

Aquatic vegetation 
Thomas Kirk's 1869 survey found a diverse, low growing mixed plant association. Quillwort (Isoetes kirkii), fennel pondweed, blunt pondweed (Potamogeton ochreatus) and red pondweed (Potamogeton cheesemanii) were abundant, waterwort (Elatine gratioloides), horses mane weed and horned pondweed were common and Lepilaena bilocularis and green algae (charophytes - corallina, fibrosa, globularis, Nitella hyalina and Nitella leptostachys) were also present . The only charophytes remaining by 1993 were Nitella and P. cheesemanii. It was claimed in 1889 that growth was too lush to allow a canoe to be paddled through parts of the lake.

By 1921 the lake was said to be infested with weeds and by 1958 the original vegetation was almost completely replaced by Egeria densa, first seen in the Waikato in 1946. Elodea Canadensis and Indian doab (Myriophyllum triphyllum) were also identified. In 1977-1979 the Wildlife Service found the same plants, but also the introduced Potamogeton crispus, the native Myriophyllum propinquum and rediscovered blunt pondweed.

In 1987 the macrophyte beds declined to about 10% of the lake area, turbidity increased (possibly due to coal mine waste) and they were dominated by hornwort, another invasive exotic. High levels of suspended sediment and phytoplankton biomass, largely shade out re-establishment of submerged macrophytes.

Fish and other water life 
Despite the pollution, 14 fish species live in the lake, with large populations of native fish, including short-finned eel (making up the most biomass), Galaxias maculatus, longfin eel, common bully and grey mullet, as well as pest fish - koi carp (next most biomass, introduced in 1872), mosquito fish, catfish and goldfish. Perhaps due to turbidity created by mining waste, or by koi carp, the native mysid shrimp is the common food of eels, smelt and common bully.

Riparian vegetation 
The lake supports the largest known population of the indigenous sedge, Fimbristylis velata. Regionally important populations of Lobelia perpusilla and Carex gaudichaudiana are present. Dominant species were usually perennials, with the alien Mercer grass and the indigenous emergent spike sedge most common.

In 1871 vegetation was dominated by raupo, flax, sedge, kahikatea, lancewood and shrubs such as Raukaua anomalus and swamp māhoe (Melicytus micranthus), which remain west of the lake.

Raupo remained on much of the lake’s margin until the 1950s, but by 1991 only 9% remained in a narrow fringe. As early as the 1890s willows were mentioned as a problem and in 1917 the river board was clearing the stream of willow. Now the shores have been colonised by crack and grey willow and floating sudds of American primrose willow and Amazonian parrots feather (Ludwigia peploides and Myriophyllum aquaticum) are now along most of the lake shore. However, a 1991 survey found 541 vascular species of which 300 were indigenous (and another 13 now apparently extinct there). Endangered or uncommon turf plants include Amphibromus fluitans, Fimbristylis velata, Carex cirrhosa, C. gaudichaudiana, Lachnagrostis striata, Pratia perpusilla, pillwort and mud buttercup (Ranunculus limosella). Threats perceived by DOC were encroachment of the weeds Paspalum distichum, Centipeda cunninghamii, Myriophyllum aquaticum, and Ludwigia palustris, and the effects of cattle grazing.

The Awaroa Reserve is mainly formed of crack willow forest, with some open swamp of flax, cabbage tree, manuka, and mingimingi. It also has  of regularly flooded kahikatea forest, with kowhai, totara, matai, pukatea and climbers, including Supplejack, swamp lawyer, bush lawyer, jasmine and pōuwhiwhi (Calystegia tuguriorum) and haaka (Viola lyalli) ground cover.

Birds 
56 species have been recorded on and around the lake, the commonest being black swan, Canada goose, paradise duck, grey duck (pārera were common in 1905), mallard, shoveler and pūkeko. Other birds include shag, bittern, heron, crake, pied stilt, gulls, fernbird  and grebe.

Since colonisation some birds have been introduced and others have become locally extinct. A pair of mute swans, presented by Sir George Grey to Captain Hutton, hatched their second brood in 1870, were donated to the Auckland Acclimatisation Society in 1871, by 1873 were a larger flock and, by 1878, there were enough to send some elsewhere. The Society added geese to the lake in 1905. Karakahia, or Australian white-eyed duck once bred on the lake and were reported in 1868.

Restoration 
Although the lake is identified as a priority 1 waterbody for stock exclusion in the Waikato Regional Plan, only about a third has been fenced to exclude cattle. A restoration project has fenced  of the south shore and planted it with over 20,000 trees. In 2017 Government contributed $900,643, as part of a $2.8m scheme, towards that and accelerated alligator weed containment, which has been sprayed since 2002. Spraying of alligator weed and yellow flag iris was done again in 2014.

Drainage proposals 
Various proposals were made to drain the lake from 1892. Some drainage was done in 1917, when the Rotongaro Canal was cut.  In 1956 the local MP, Hallyburton Johnstone, suggested the lake could be turned into farmland "at no great cost", a claim probably based on a 1933 estimate and a 1911 engineers' survey. In 1937 Raglan County Council raised a loan for extensive drainage of the lake.

Boat ramps 
There are boat ramps at Whangape Domain and Shuggs Landing. There is also road access to the lake edge at Beverland Rd. To prevent the spread of alligator weed, which was first found at the lake in 2003, boats need to be cleaned before and after using the lake. The Domain ramp is hard to access and Waikato District Council wasn't aware that it owned it.

References

External links 
Maps
 1925
 1942
 current 1:50,000
Illustrations -
 1844 kumara storage huts, native houses
 1905 - boat on Awaroa River, another boat, duck shooting on lake - Auckland Weekly News
 1954 aerial view
 Google map street scene from Glen Murray Rd

Lakes of Waikato
Waikato District
Hot springs of New Zealand